This is a list of heads of government of Sierra Leone, from the establishment of the office of Chief Minister in 1954 until the present day. The office of Prime Minister was abolished after the constitutional referendum in 1978, and reinstated in 2018 with the appointment of David J. Francis as Chief Minister.

Chief minister of Sierra Leone Protectorate

Prime minister of Sierra Leone Protectorate

Prime ministers of Sierra Leone

Military rule (1967–1968)

Chief ministers of Sierra Leone

See also
List of colonial governors of Sierra Leone
President of Sierra Leone
List of heads of state of Sierra Leone

External links
World Statesmen - Sierra Leone

Government of Sierra Leone
History of Sierra Leone
1961 establishments in Sierra Leone
Sierra Leone